Jason Basford Parrish (September 28, 1878 – October 3, 1906) was an American football player and coach.  He served as the head football coach at Hampden–Sydney College in 1902 and as co-head coach with Ancil D. Brown at Syracuse University in 1903.  Parrish died on October 3, 1906. He was buried at Rose Ridge Cemetery.

Head coaching record

References

1878 births
1906 deaths
19th-century players of American football
Hampden–Sydney Tigers football coaches
Syracuse Orange football coaches
Syracuse Orange football players
People from Canandaigua, New York
Players of American football from New York (state)